Zeferino is a Portuguese surname and given name. Notable people with the name include:

Given name
Zeferino (Portuguese footballer) (born 1978), Portuguese retired footballer
João Zeferino da Costa (1840–1915), Brazilian painter and designer
Zeferino Martins (born 1985), East Timorese footballer
Zeferino Nandayapa (1931–2010), Mexican folk and classical marimba player
Zeferino dos Prazeres, São Toméan politician
Zeferino Torreblanca (born 1954), Mexican politician and former Governor of Guerrero
Zeferino González y Díaz Tuñón (1831–1894), Spanish Dominican theologian, and philosopher, Archbishop of Seville and Cardinal
Zeferino Peña Cuéllar, known by his alias "Don Zefe", Mexican suspected drug lord 
Zeferino Vaz (1908–1981), led the construction, establishment and development of the Unicamp university, State of São Paulo, Brazil

Surname
António Zeferino (born 1966), Cape Verdean athlete, specializing in long-distance running, marathon and half marathon
Armando Zeferino Soares (1920–2007), Cape Verdean composer
Manuel Zeferino (born 1960), Portuguese cyclist

See also
Rodovia Professor Zeferino Vaz, a highway in the state of São Paulo, Brazil

 Ceferino
 Zephyrinus

Portuguese-language surnames
Portuguese masculine given names
Spanish masculine given names